Presidential elections were held for the first time in Estonia on 20 September 1992. However, as no candidate gained over 50% of the votes, a second round was held in Parliament on 5 October 1992 in which Lennart Meri was elected. Voter turnout was 68.0%. Following this election, all subsequent presidential elections have been carried out in the Electoral College or in Parliament.

Results

References

Presidential elections in Estonia
Estonia
1992 in Estonia